Ice Harbor Lock and Dam is a hydroelectric, concrete gravity run-of-the-river  dam in the northwest United States. On the lower Snake River in southeastern Washington, it bridges Walla Walla and Franklin counties.

Construction began in June 1955; the main structure and three generators were completed  in 1961, with an additional three generators finished in 1976. Generating capacity is 603 megawatts, with an overload capacity of 693 MW.

Dam system
Built and operated by the U.S. Army Corps of Engineers, Ice Harbor Dam is part of the Columbia River Basin system of dams.

Visitor center
Inside the dam on the south side of the river is a large visitor center that has been recently updated to include a new film "The Snake - River of Life" and a new modern interactive touch screen kiosk with information on the dam and recreational opportunities in the area. The visitor center also has a fish ladder viewing room which offers an excellent view of migrating salmon, steelhead, and shad. Due to security, visitors must pass through the security gate to gain access.

Surrounding water bodies
Lake Sacajawea, named for Sacajawea, is formed behind the dam.

 Navigation lock
 Single-lift
  wide
  long

Climate
The record, which was shared with Wahluke ( in 1928), was eventually surpassed on June 29, 2021, when Hanford reached .

Northwest Infrastructure Proposal

Since 2019 Representative Mike Simpson (R), representing central and eastern Idaho, has been working on and presenting the $33 billion  Columbia Basin Fund, as a way to restore the endangered Columbia-Snake basin salmon, including the Snake River sockeye salmon, and steelhead. The plan was released in February 2021. The ultimate goal of the plan is to remove or breach (partial removal) four dams on the lower Snake River. This would involve the Ice Harbor, Lower Granite Dam, Little Goose Dam, and the Lower Monumental Dam beginning with the farthest inland or Lower Granite Dam. The fund would include creating alternate energy plans that would have to be implemented and finished first before any dam removal. The plan has brought together an extensive coalition of organizations, local, state, national and international, as well as the Yakama Nation, Confederated Tribes of the Umatilla Indian Reservation, Shoshone-Bannock Tribe, and the Nez Perce Tribe, in a proposed ''Northwest State and Tribal Fish and Wildlife Council", in support of the plan.

The Bonneville Power Administration advocates for keeping the dams even though the power from the four dams are considered surplus. and others oppose as written. Opposition from 17 environmental groups is the proposed license extension to 35 years for the other dams in the Columbia Basin as well as a moratorium on salmon-related lawsuits. 

Washington Governor Jay Inslee and Senator Patty Murray are in opposition stating that any proposal needs a "science-based," "community-driven" approach. The Whitehouse, through the White House Council on Environmental Quality, released two reports that looks at the possibility of dam removal. U.S. Representatives. Dan Newhouse, Cathy McMorris Rodgers, and Jaime Herrera Beutler, all from Washington, Cliff Bentz of Oregon, Russ Fulcher of Idaho, and Matt Rosendale of Montana, referred to the report as biased. More than $17 billion has been spent on the recovery of the fish since they were classified as endangered species in 1991 but the efforts to reach sustainable levels has been called a failure.

An association of river commercial groups commissioned a study concluded that dam removal would jeopardize already fragile local and regional economies and that the needed train and trucking increase would require up to $2 billion in road and rail improvements.

See also

List of dams in the Columbia River watershed
Lower Granite Dam
Little Goose Dam
Lower Monumental Dam

References

External links 

  U.S. Army Corps of Engineers Ice Harbor Lock and Dam
  U.S. Army Corps of Engineers Ice Harbor Visitor Center.
 Hydroelectric Information for Columbia and Snake River Projects from Columbia River Research Unit at University of Washington

Dams in Washington (state)
Buildings and structures in Franklin County, Washington
Hydroelectric power plants in Washington (state)
Buildings and structures in Walla Walla County, Washington
United States Army Corps of Engineers dams
Dams completed in 1962
Energy infrastructure completed in 1962
Dams on the Snake River
Gravity dams